Triplophysa yaopeizhii is a species of stone loach endemic to Tibet.

References

Y
Freshwater fish of China
Endemic fauna of Tibet
Fish described in 1995